Antonio "Toñito" Gonzales (born 16 May 1986) is a Peruvian footballer who currently is a free agent and last played for Pirata F.C. in the Peruvian second tier. He plays as a defensive midfielder.

He was referred as the successor of José Luis Carranza because of the passion and love with which he defends his team. He has a very aggressive style of play that makes his rivals doubtful to face him even though his height is shorter than the average. He has also been compared with Arturo Vidal due to his tough and ruthless style of play. In 2008, he had a son and named him Mayer Simão in honor of his teammate Mayer Candelo and Atlético Madrid midfielder Simão.

Club career 
Toñito González was formed as a footballer in the youth levels of Universitario de Deportes, one of the most important and historically relevant clubs of the Peruvian top division. He played for the their second team in the 2002/03 season before playing for América de Cochahuayco, which operates as a twin club of Universitario de Deportes in the lower tiers of Peruvian football. 

González was promoted to the first team under manager Jorge Amado Nunes during the 2006/07 season, amounting a total of 12 league appearances by the end of it. Until his departure in 2015, González played 214 games for Universitario de Deportes becoming a fan-favorite and a club legend due to his tangible passion and aggressive defending abilities which earned him 95 yellow cards and 10 red cards throughout his career. Toñito González's only goal for his hometown club came as out-of-the box angled rebound in a 1–1 game against FBC Melgar during the 2013/14 Torneo del Inca in Lima

After a brief and uneventful 3-month spell in Ayacucho FC, González signed for Universidad César Vallejo in August 2016 as the team edged relegation to the Peruvian second division. González's 6 league appearances did not prove to be sufficient to help the team avoid relegation and Universidad César Vallejo lost its slot in the top tier of Peruvian football. In the following season, the club accessed the promotion play-offs but lost the final 3–5 on penalties against Sport Boys in a game where González remained in the bench. Sourly, González left the club in 2017 with 21 games played for the Trujillo team.

Honours

Club
Universitario de Deportes
 Torneo Descentralizado (2): 2009, 2013
 Apertura: 2008

Country 
Peru national team
 Copa America: Bronze medal 2011

References

External links 

1986 births
Living people
Footballers from Lima
Peruvian footballers
Peru international footballers
Peruvian Primera División players
Club Universitario de Deportes footballers
Association football midfielders
2011 Copa América players